Free House may refer to:
Free House (horse), an American Thoroughbred racehorse
Free house (pub), a British pub that is owned independently of the breweries that supply it

See also
Freihaus, a house within a town's walls but legally outside the town's domain